Wakriya Athlétic Club is a football club based in Boké, Guinea. They club plays in the Guinée Championnat National, which is the highest league in Guinean football.

They club will take part of the 2018–19 CAF Confederation Cup, as runners-up of the 2018 National Cup Guinee News.

Achievements

National
Guinée Championnat National: 0
Guinée Coupe Nationale: 0
Runner-up: 2018

Performance in CAF competitions
CAF Confederation Cup: 1 appearance
2018–19 –

References

External links

Football clubs in Guinea